Ricardo Montez (born Levy Isaac Attias; 20 September 1923 – 26 October 2010) was an English actor best known for his role as the Spanish bartender Juan Cervantes, a student in Jeremy Brown's EFL class in the ITV comedy series Mind Your Language and one of four students (along with Giovanni Cupello, Anna Schmidt, and Ranjeet Singh) to appear in all four series.

Life and career
Born Levy Isaac Attias on 23 September 1923 in Gibraltar to Jewish parents, he and his family were evacuated to England during World War II. On returning home, he worked in different jobs, including as an extra in films shot in Gibraltar. While appearing in the British film Wonderful Things! (1958), the actor Frankie Vaughan persuaded him to travel to London and become an actor, which he did in 1962, changing his name at Vaughan's suggestion to Ricardo Montez. He appeared primarily in television programmes, including The Saint, The Avengers, Doctor at Sea and Don't Drink the Water, in which he usually played Spanish characters, before being cast in his best known role as Juan Cervantes, the Spanish bartender in a class of mature English language students, in the situation comedy series Mind Your Language from 1977 and 1979, reprising his role in a revival of the series in 1986. In his later years, Montez continued to appear on television in programmes including Sharpe's Honour and Casualty, as well as in commercials. His final acting role was in the film Mamma Mia! (2008). He lived in Richmond, London, and used to visit Gibraltar twice a year. He married Orivida Hatchwell in 1953; they had a daughter, Clara, and a granddaughter, Sara. Montez died from cancer at his daughter's home in Marbella, Spain on 26 October 2010, at the age of 87.

Selected credits

Film
 The Girl Hunters (1963) - Skinny Guy (as Richard Montez)
 633 Squadron (1964) - New Zealand Pilot at Casino (uncredited)
 Maroc 7 (1967) - Pablo (as Richard Montez)
 Carry on in the Legion (1967) - Riff at Abdul's Tent (uncredited)
 Don't Raise the Bridge, Lower the River (1968) - Arab (as Richard Montez)
 Vendetta for the Saint (1969) - Nino (as Richard Montez)
 A Talent for Loving (1969) - Bandit (uncredited)
 11 Harrowhouse (1974) - 2nd Manager (uncredited)
 Are You Being Served? (1977) - Revolutionary (uncredited)
 Incognito (1997) - Juan Del Campo
 Mamma Mia! (2008) - Stavros (final film role)

Television
 Crane (1963) - Omar
 The Plane Makers (1963) - Mr. Prato
 Man of the World (1962-1963) - Driver / Garcia / Miguel
 ITV Play of the Week (1964) - Airport official
 No Hiding Place (1964) - Bruno Brunone
 Detective (1964) - Jose
 The Rat Catchers (1966) - Tutor
 The Avengers (1967) - Colonel Josino
 Man in a Suitcase (1967-1968) - Guard / Police Officer / Spanish Taxi Driver
 The Saint (1962-1969) - Carlos Segoia / Guieseppe / Head Waiter
 The Champions (1969) - Detective
 From a Bird's Eye View (1971) - Spanish Sergeant
 UFO (1971) - 2nd Mexican Bandit
 The Persuaders! (1972) - Inspector Santos
 Jason King (1972) - Garcia
 Barlow at Large (1973) - Henry Rivera
 Doctor at Sea (1974) - Barman
 The Top Secret Life of Edgar Briggs (1974) - Zammit
 Don't Drink the Water (1974-1975) - Doctor / Jose
 The Onedin Line (1976) - Buckle
 Doctor on the Go (1977) - Mr. Valentini
 The Likes of Sykes (1980)
 The Jim Davidson Show (1981)
 Duty Free (1984) - Pedro
 Never the Twain (1991) - Miguel
 Sharpe's Honour (1994) - Father Sanchez
 Mind Your Language (1977-1986) - Juan Cervantes
 Casualty (2001-2002) - Gerald Kirby / Xavier
 Auf Wiedersehen, Pet (1986-2004) - Fuentes / Ofelia's Grandfather

Writing credits
Freewheelers

References

External links

1923 births
2010 deaths
British male film actors
British male television actors
Gibraltarian Jews
Gibraltarian emigrants to the United Kingdom